Franklin Johnson Foil (born October 31, 1964) is a Republican member of the Louisiana State Senate for the 16th district, serving since 2020. He formerly represented the 70th district in the Louisiana House of Representatives from 2008 until 2020.

Early life

Foil was born and reared in Baton Rouge, as one of two sons of Frank Foil and the former Judith Johnson. As a high school student, he was a member of the National Honor Society and earned varsity letters in football, tennis and cross country.  He achieved the rank of Eagle Scout in 1980. In 1982 he was selected to attend the Louisiana Boys State Program, serving as a counselor for the next 5 years then as a board member for 10 years. He is also a U.S. Navy veteran, a captain in the Navy Reserve Judge Advocate General's Corps, and has served as Judge Pro Tempore for the Baton Rouge City Court. He has been inducted into the Louisiana State University Cadets of the Ole War Skule Hall of Honor and is the recipient of the Rear Admiral Hugh Howell Award of Excellence for Outstanding Senior Officer.

Election history

In his first bid for political office, Foil defeated Metro Councilman Pat Culbertson in the general election held on November 17, 2007: 5,399 (53 percent) to 4,809 (47 percent).

Foil was easily reelected in the primary election held on October 22, 2011. He defeated the Independent Greg Baldwin, 6,947 votes (77.4 percent) to 2,033 (22.6 percent). He won again in 2015 by a similar margin, 8,401 votes (74.4 percent) to 2,891 (25.6 percent) for the Democratic candidate, Shamaka Schumake.

Legislation
In this first legislative session, Foil passed legislation requiring insurance companies to cover medical treatment for children on the autism spectrum. In 2018, Foil passed legislation to establish a tax-free savings account for tuition for K-12 education. Foil was appointed head of the Homeland Security Committee in 2008 and is also currently serving as vice chair of the House Appropriations Committee.

References
 Franklin Foil's official Representative page
 Franklin Foil's personal website
 House Bill 523

Notes

1964 births
Republican Party members of the Louisiana House of Representatives
Politicians from Baton Rouge, Louisiana
Louisiana State University alumni
Living people
American Presbyterians
Loyola University New Orleans alumni
Louisiana lawyers
United States Navy officers
21st-century American politicians